Écaussinnes is a municipality of Wallonia located in the province of Hainaut, Belgium. 

On 1 January 2018 Écaussinnes had a total population of 11,135. The total area is 34.77 km2 which gives a population density of 320 inhabitants per km2.

The municipality consists of the following districts: Écaussinnes-d'Enghien, Écaussinnes-Lalaing, and Marche-lez-Écaussinnes.

The city hosts the "Oberbayern" Festival each year in August, and hosted the Spring Blues Festival from 1988 to 2013.

History
To be expanded

Nearly 100 local citizens were saved from being killed by the German army by the intercession of Qian Xiuling. There is a street named Rue Perlinghi in her honour. "Perlinghi" was her married name.

Postal history

The ECAUSSINNES post-office opened on 1 December 1850. It used a postal code 158 with bars (before 1864), and 105 with points before 1874. 
The ECAUSSINNES-D'ENGHIEN post-office opened on 13 November 1879, MARCHE-LEZ-ECAUSSINNES on 10 May 1880.

Postal codes in 1969:
- 7180 Marche-lez-Écaussinnes
- 7190 Écaussinnes-d'Enghien
- 7191 Écaussinnes-Lalaing

Postal codes since at least 1990: 7190, 7191 Écaussinnes-Lalaing

References

External links
 

Municipalities of Hainaut (province)